Magdalena is a municipality in Veracruz, Mexico. It is located in the central zone of Veracruz, about 125 km from the state capital Xalapa. It has an area of 28.79 km2.

Magdalena is delimited to the north by San Andrés Tenejapan and Ixtaczoquitlán, to the east and south by Tequila and to the west by San Andrés Tenejapan.

It produces principally maize and coffee.

A celebration in honor of Santa María Magdalena, patron saint of the town, takes place in July.

The weather in Magdalena is cold all year with rain in summer and autumn.

References

External links 
  Municipal official webpage
  Municipal official information

Municipalities of Veracruz